The following lists events that happened during 1949 in New Zealand.

Most New Zealanders became New Zealand citizens in addition to being British subjects, as the British Nationality and New Zealand Citizenship Act 1948 came into effect.

The National government of Sydney Holland was elected in the 1949 New Zealand general election.

Population
 Estimated population as of 31 December: 1,892,100
 Increase since 31 December 1948: 38,200 (2.06%)
 Males per 100 females: 100.7

Incumbents

Regal and viceregal
Head of State – George VI
Governor-General – Lieutenant-General The Lord Freyberg VC GCMG KCB KBE DSO

Government
The 28th New Zealand Parliament continued. Government was the Labour until after the November general election, which saw it replaced by National Party.

Iriaka Rātana (Labour) is the first Māori woman elected to Parliament.

Speaker of the House – Robert McKeen
Prime Minister – Peter Fraser then Sidney Holland
Deputy Prime Minister – Keith Holyoake (from 13 December)
Minister of Finance – Walter Nash then Sidney Holland
Minister of Foreign Affairs – Peter Fraser then Frederick Doidge
Attorney-General – Rex Mason then Clifton Webb
Chief Justice – Sir Humphrey O'Leary

Parliamentary opposition 
 Leader of the Opposition –  Sidney Holland (National Party) until 13 December, then Peter Fraser (Labour).

Main centre leaders
Mayor of Auckland – John Allum
Mayor of Hamilton – Harold David Caro
Mayor of Wellington – Will Appleton
Mayor of Christchurch – Ernest Andrews
Mayor of Dunedin – Donald Cameron

Events 
 1 January: the status of New Zealand Citizen comes into existence.
 9 March: Referendums on gambling (passed) and extending hotel hours (failed).
 3 August: Referendum on military training (passed)
 29 November: Elections to the four Māori electorates
 30 November: General election won by National Party under Sidney Holland

Arts and literature

See 1949 in art, 1949 in literature, :Category:1949 books

Music

See: 1949 in music

Radio

See: Public broadcasting in New Zealand

Film

See: :Category:1949 film awards, 1949 in film, List of New Zealand feature films, Cinema of New Zealand, :Category:1949 films

Sport

Archery
National Champions
Open Men – W. Burton (Gisborne)
Open Women – D. Johnstone (Dunedin)

Athletics
 George Bromley wins his second national title in the men's marathon, clocking 2:40:05.6 in Christchurch.

Basketball
Interpovincial Champions: Men – Wellington
Interpovincial Champions: Women – Palmerston North

Chess
 The 56th National Chess Championship was held in Wanganui, and was won by A.E. Nield of Auckland.

Cricket

Horse racing

Harness racing
 New Zealand Trotting Cup – Loyal Nurse
 Auckland Trotting Cup – Captain Sandy (2nd win)

Thoroughbred racing
 The New Zealand horse Foxzami, ridden by W. Fellows, wins the 1949 Melbourne Cup

Lawn bowls
The national outdoor lawn bowls championships are held in Auckland.
 Men's singles champion – S. Gooch (Kahutia Bowling Club)
 Men's pair champions – Frank Livingstone, J.H. Mingins (skip) (Onehunga Bowling Club)
 Men's fours champions – A.J. Murdoch, H.L. Rule, A. Rivers, Pete Skoglund (skip) (Otahuhu Bowling Club)

Rugby
:Category:Rugby union in New Zealand, :Category:All Blacks

 3 September: The All Blacks lose two tests on the same day
 Ranfurly Shield

Rugby league
New Zealand national rugby league team

Soccer
 The Chatham Cup is won by Petone who beat Northern 1–0 in the final.
 Provincial league champions:
	Auckland:	Eden
	Canterbury:	Technical OB
	Hawke's Bay:	Napier HSOB
	Nelson:
	Otago:	Northern
	South Canterbury:	Northern Hearts
	Southland:	Brigadiers
	Taranaki:	City
	Waikato:	Rotowaro
	Wanganui:	Wanganui Athletic
	Wellington:	Seatoun

Births
 22 January: Cilla McQueen, poet
 24 January: Bill Bush, rugby player
 28 January: Mike Moore, Prime Minister and Director-General of the World Trade Organization (d. 2020)
 15 February: Ashraf Choudhary, politician
 19 February: Brenda Matthews, sprinter
 28 April: Steve Gilpin, musician (d. 1992)
 20 September: Alan McIntyre, field hockey player
 10 October: Lance Cairns, cricketer
 2 November: Bruce Biddle, road cyclist
 29 November (in England): Dave Bright, soccer player
 Laurence Aberhart, photographer
 Laurence Clark, cartoonist
 John Hanlon, musician
 Donna Awatere Huata, politician
 Nigel Brown, painter
 Ian Ewen-Street, politician

Deaths
 25 May: George William von Zedlitz, professor of languages
 20 August: Annie Lee Rees, writer. 
 7 October: Matiu Ratana, politician and Ratana church leader
 29 October: Patrick Harvey, rugby union player
 20 December: Jane Mander, novelist
 28 December: Jack Lovelock''', athlete

See also
:Category:1949 births
:Category:1949 deaths
History of New Zealand
List of years in New Zealand
Military history of New Zealand
Timeline of New Zealand history
Timeline of New Zealand's links with Antarctica
Timeline of the New Zealand environment

References

 
Years of the 20th century in New Zealand